Christopher McClaren (born 14 March 1963) is an English former footballer who played three matches on a non-contract basis for Darlington in the latter part of the 1986–87 Football League season. A defender, he also played non-league football for Walton & Hersham.

References

1963 births
Living people
Footballers from Bristol
English footballers
Association football defenders
Walton & Hersham F.C. players
Darlington F.C. players
English Football League players